Ungheni (called Bosia until 1996) is a commune in Iași County, Western Moldavia, Romania, part of the Iași metropolitan area. It is composed of four villages: Bosia (the commune center), Coada Stâncii, Mânzătești and Ungheni. 

There is a bridge across the Prut and a border checkpoint to Moldova. There is another border town with the same name in the Republic of Moldova (Ungheni), on the other side of the Prut River.

Gallery

References

Communes in Iași County
Localities in Western Moldavia
Moldova–Romania border crossings
Populated places on the Prut